Collinsville Cemetery may refer to:

 Collinsville Cemetery, Queensland, a heritage-listed cemetery in Australia
 Collinsville Cemetery (Collinsville, New York), listed on the National Register of Historic Places (NRHP) in Lewis County